Below are different lists of all the tallest buildings in Colorado Springs.

Tallest Multi-Story Buildings
Below is a list of the tallest multistory (3+) buildings in Colorado Springs with heights over 100ft.

Tallest Non Multi-Story Buildings
Below is a list of the tallest non-multistory (<3 stories) buildings in Colorado Springs with known heights.

Cancelled buildings

References

Skyscrapers of Colorado Springs

Buildings and structures in Colorado Springs, Colorado
Colorado Springs
Tallest in Colorado Springs